The Sharapova–S. Williams rivalry was a tennis rivalry between Maria Sharapova and Serena Williams, who met 22 times between 2004 and 2019. Their overall head-to-head was 20–2 favoring Williams, Williams leading 8–1 in Grand Slam meetings, and 3–1 in Grand Slam finals. Their last meeting in a Grand Slam final was at the 2015 Australian Open.

Williams and Sharapova played a total of 48 sets. Of these, 41 were won by Williams and 7 by Sharapova. Five of the sets won by Sharapova were during the 2004–2005 period, at the beginning of the rivalry, when Sharapova managed to secure her only two wins. After 2005, Sharapova only won 2 more sets, in 2008 and 2013. 

The most lopsided match between these two players was in the women's singles final at the 2012 Summer Olympics in London. There, Williams beat Sharapova (6–0, 6–1), in a match that lasted for 62 minutes.

In a 2012 interview, Sharapova said her toughest opponent was Monica Seles. Williams held the number one position on the WTA Singles Rankings for 319 weeks, Sharapova for 21 weeks.

Head-to-head 

Maria Sharapova–Serena Williams (2–20)

Breakdown of the rivalry 
 Hard courts: Serena Williams, 13–1
 Clay courts: Serena Williams, 4–0
 Grass courts: Serena Williams, 3–1
 Indoor carpet: none
 Grand Slam matches: Serena Williams, 8–1
 Grand Slam finals: Serena Williams, 3–1
 Year-End Championships matches: 1–1
 Year-End Championships finals: 1–1
 Fed Cup matches: none
 All finals: Serena Williams, 7–2

See also 
 List of tennis rivalries

References

External links 
 "Why Serena Williams vs. Maria Sharapova Is Still the WTA's Best Rivalry", Merlisa Lawrence Corbett, Bleacher Report, January 25, 2016
 "Maria Sharapova and Serena Williams put 15-year feud on line at US Open", Kevin Mitchell, The Guardian, August 24, 2019
 "Rivalries of the Decade: Serena Williams vs. Maria Sharapova", WTA Official YouTube channel, December 24, 2019

Tennis rivalries
Sports rivalries in the United States
Maria Sharapova
Serena Williams